French Blue or French blue may refer to:
French blue (color), a shade of blue
French Blue (airline), formerly French long-haul low-cost airline
Tavernier Blue, a diamond that was part of the French crown jewels
Hope Diamond, a diamond cut from the Tavernier